Lake Cushman is a  lake and reservoir on the north fork of the Skokomish River in Mason County, Washington. The lake originally was a long narrow broadening of the Skokomish River formed in a glacial trough and dammed by a terminal moraine from the Vashon Glaciation during the most recent ice age.

The lake was expanded after construction of the Cushman Dam No. 1. The lake is maintained by this dam and provides electrical power to the Tacoma Power system.

As a popular retreat for hiking, fishing, boating and kayaking, Lake Cushman's shoreline is dotted with resorts and rental cabins. The lake is notable for its beautiful crystal clear blue water and the huge round rocks surrounding it, as well as thick stands of hemlock, fir and cedar trees.

Lake Cushman was named in honor of Orrington Cushman, who served as interpreter for Governor Isaac Stevens during the Treaty of Point Elliott negotiations with Puget Sound Natives in 1854.

Geography 

The northern part of the lake (FS-24) is near the Staircase Entrance to Olympic National Park. Surrounding the lake are Mount Ellinor, Mount Washington, Cub Peak, Mount Gladys, and Mount Rose. Access to Lake Cushman is limited during the winter months due to road closures and hazardous conditions.

History 

In 1889, the Antlers Hotel was built on Lake Cushman by a pair of East Coast businessmen on the property of Russell Homan. It attracted tourists from the Seattle area, who would arrive at Hoodsport by steamship and continue onward to Lake Cushman via stagecoach. The two-story hotel was destroyed in 1925 after it was inundated by rising lake waters following the construction of the Cushman Dam No. 1 by the City of Tacoma. After the property was flooded, many have attempted to search for the remains of the hotel under the lake.

Recreation

Hiking 

The Lake Cushman area offers access to multiple hiking trails:

 Big Creek Campground Trail #827
 Big Creek Trailhead 
 Big Creek Upper Loop #827.1
 Copper Creek Trail #876
 Copper Creep Trailhead 
 Dry Creek East Trailhead 
 Dry Creek Trail #872
 Jefferson Pass Trailhead
 Mt. Ellinor Connector Trail #827.2
 Mt. Ellinor Lower Trailhead 
 Mt. Ellinor Trail #812 
 Mt. Ellinor Upper Trailhead

Fishing 

Lake Cushman has year-round open season fishing and is stocked with Kokanee salmon and Cutthroat trout. Skokomish Park is fitted with a boat ramp with three paved ramps that allows access to the lake for a small day-use fee. Boat rentals are also available at the park.

Swimming and watersports 

Swimming, boating, kayaking and cliff jumping are also among the most popular activities for Lake Cushman visitors. Public access to the lake is available at Skokomish Park and Lake Cushman Resort.

Lodging 

The Skokomish Park campground is a former state park that was sold to private operators in 2002. The campground includes tent and RV campsites, group campsites and picnic areas. Further away from the lake are Big Creek Campground in Olympic National Forest and Staircase Campground in Olympic National Park.

The Lake Cushman Resort was permanently closed in 2018 due to the expiration of its 50-year lease with Tacoma Public Utilities.

Incidents

In August 2020, the U.S. Forest Service closed all public roads leading to Lake Cushman due to concerns of overcrowding amid the COVID-19 pandemic. A  weekend traffic jam on the lake's primary two-lane, unpaved road had caused concerns about access for emergency vehicles, including an incident where one man died of drowning. The Forest Service also cited the congregation of people as being a potential vector for spreading COVID-19 and noted several fights, assaults, and other incidents.

References

External links
 Lake Levels and River Flows, Cushman Project Settlement, Tacoma Power
 Photograph of Lake Cushman circa 1899 from the Lick Observatory Records Digital Archive, UC Santa Cruz Library's Digital Collections

Cushman
Bodies of water of Mason County, Washington
Olympic National Forest
Tacoma Public Utilities